Matthew Stewart, 2nd Earl of Lennox (14609 September 1513), was a prominent Scottish nobleman.  Stewart was the son of John Stewart, 1st Earl of Lennox, and Margaret Montgomerie, daughter of Alexander Montgomerie, 1st Lord Montgomerie. He died fighting in the Battle of Flodden Field.

He married firstly, on 13 June 1490, Margaret Lyle, daughter of Robert Lyle, 2nd Lord Lyle, Chief Justiciar of Scotland. On 9 April 1494, he married Elizabeth Hamilton, daughter of James Hamilton, 1st Lord Hamilton, and Mary Stewart, Princess of Scotland, daughter of King James II of Scotland.

Stewart and Elizabeth Hamilton had six children: Mungo Stewart, Agnes Stewart, John Stewart, 3rd Earl of Lennox, Margaret Stewart, Elizabeth Stewart, and Catherine Stewart.

He was Lord Provost of Glasgow in 1497, and from 1509 to 1513.

Ancestors

Sources 
G. E. Cokayne et al., eds. The Complete Peerage of England, Scotland, Ireland, Great Britain, and the United Kingdom, Extant, Extinct, or Dormant. Reprint ed. (Gloucester, UK: Alan Sutton Publishing, 2000).

Stewart, Matthew, 2nd Earl
Matthew
Deaths at the Battle of Flodden
1460 births
1513 deaths
Court of James IV of Scotland
Lord Provosts of Glasgow
15th-century Scottish peers
16th-century Scottish peers